List of shipwreck sites which are popular amongst scuba divers for wreck diving, arranged by geographical distribution.

North Atlantic

Ireland 
, Baltimore, County Cork

United Kingdom 
  – The Royal Navy's first British-designed submarine
  – A-class submarine of the Royal Navy
  – German ship wrecked at the Farne Islands in 1921. Now a dive site
  – Greek registered freighter sunk off Dorset after a collision
  
  – Canadian cargo ship, sunk off the Needles during World War II
 
 
 
 
 
  
  
  
 
  
  
 
 
 
  
 
 
  
 
  
  
 
  
 
 
 
  
  
 
  
 
 
  
  
 
 
  
 
 
 
 
 
 
 
 
 , Cornwall, United Kingdom
 
 
 
 
 
 
 
  
 
 
 
 List of shipwrecks of the Isles of Scilly, Cornwall

United States
 
 , Nantucket Sound. This dive is becoming less common, as the rapid deterioration of the wreck is making diving more difficult on top of the already treacherous dive to reach the vessel.

Caribbean Sea

Aruba
 
 

Bonaire
 

British Virgin Islands
 
Cayman Islands
 

Curaçao
, 

Grenada
 

Mexico
 

Mustique

Florida
Eagle, Islamorada, Florida
USS General Hoyt S Vandenberg, Key West, Florida
USS Oriskany, Pensacola, Florida
USS Spiegel Grove, Florida Keys, Florida

Mediterranean Sea
Cyprus 
Constandis
Lady Thetis
Zenobia 

Italy 
Haven

Malta 
Cominoland 
Imperial Eagle
Karwela
HMS Maori
P29
P31
Rozi
St. Michael
Tug No. 10
Tug No. 2
Um El Faroud 
X127
XlendiNorth Carolina, Outer Banks

U-352
USS Monitor
USS Tarpon
USS Yancey
USS Schurz (SMS Geier)
USCGC Spar
USS Indra
SS Papoose
USS Aeolus

Scapa Flow, Scotland
SMS Markgraf

South Atlantic

Brazil
 Pirapama, Vapor Bahia, Corveta Camacuã and other wrecks in Recife;Corveta Ipiranga in Fernando de Noronha; Buenos Aires at Rio de Janeiro; other wrecks along the coast of Brazil

East Pacific
Wreck Alley, San Diego, California

West Pacific
HMAS Adelaide, New South Wales, Australia
HMAS Brisbane, Queensland, Australia
 , Queensland, Australia
HMAS Canberra, Victoria, Australia
 , Tulamben, Bali, Indonesia
MS Mikhail Lermontov, New ZealandRainbow Warrior, New Zealand
HMNZS Wellington, New Zealand
 Toa Maru, Solomon Islands
SS President Coolidge, Vanuatu

Bikini Atoll
  - aircraft carrier
  - battleship
  - attack transport
  - attack transport
  - destroyer
  - destroyer
  - submarine
  - submarine
  - battleship
  - light cruiser

 Guam 

 American Tanker, WWII American concrete barge in Apra Harbor
 Aratama Maru, a WWII Japanese military transport in Talofofo Bay
 , WWI German merchant raider in Apra Harbor
 Kitsugawa Maru, a WWII Japanese transport in Apra Harbor
 Tokai Maru'', WWII Japanese passenger-cargo ship in Apra Harbor

Truk Lagoon

Indian Ocean
Al Munassir, Muscat, Oman
HMS Hermes, Sri Lanka
Inket Wreck, World War II Japanese shipwreck, Andaman Islands, India

Red Sea

SS Thistlegorm, Egypt
SS Carnatic, Egypt
Salem Express, Egypt
 Giannis D, Egypt 
 Rosalie Moller, Egypt 
INS Sufa, Israel

Freshwater Shipwrecks

Great Lakes
 List of shipwrecks in the Thunder Bay National Marine Sanctuary
RMS Empress of Ireland, Saint Lawrence River
SS America, Lake Superior
SS Carl D. Bradley, Lake Michigan
SS Cedarville, Lake Huron
SS D.R.Hanna, Lake Huron
SS Eber Ward, Lake Michigan
 SS Ironsides, Lake Michigan
 SS Isaac M. Scott, Lake Huron
 SS Pewabic, Lake Huron
, Lake Michigan
SS Regina, Lake Huron
SS Vienna, Lake Superior

See also
 
Lists of shipwrecks
Sinking ships for wreck diving sites

References

Notes

 
Diving
Wreck diving
Wreck diving